Volver a Empezar (English title: Starting Again) is a Mexican telenovela produced by Emilio Larrosa for Televisa in 199495.

Yuri and Chayanne starred as protagonists, while Claudia Silva and Rafael Sánchez Navarro starred as antagonists.

Plot
This is the story of Mexican diva Reny, Puerto Rican singing legend Chayanne, Lalo, Tony, Sandra, Poncho and Jessica. Reny is a 26-year-old whose father leaves her a fortune upon dying, and who dreams of someday meeting Chayanne, who is (in real life and in the telenovela) an international singing star and teen idol.

The dream comes true because Reny's boyfriend, named Santiago is a music producer and he arranges for the meeting to happen after one of Chayanne's concerts. As the drama unfolds, Reny becomes famous and she and Chayanne start a close friendship which later turns into romance.

Santiago becomes increasingly jealous and evil. Reny becomes afraid of Santiago and starts seeing him less and less. Then Santiago's lawyer, Tony, starts to develop an interest for Reny. While all this is going, in Reny's house, her sister Sandra, becomes increasingly jealous of Reny's success and the fact their father left Reni the family fortune.

Unknown to the TV viewer for most of the soap is the fact Sandra had a degenerative mental illness and that was why Reny's father left Reny the fortune and not Sandra. Sandra and Santiago have a diabolic plan where they will make Reny have an accident during one of her concerts, and the plan works, leaving Reny paralyzed and with amnesia after her fall.

Eventually, she recovers her mind and begins to walk again, and she plans her return to the world of show business under the name of Chaquira (not to be confused with the real life singer Shakira). She uses that name so not to tip off her enemies as to who she really is and that she's still alive.

Through all of this, and before Reny's accident happened, a fan of hers, Lalo, becomes her friend and falls in love with her, causing the ire of Jessica, who has just broken up with Poncho. Jessica becomes enemies with Reny and her attraction towards Lalo in turn makes Poncho mad and jealous too.

Chayanne had to go away from Reny because of his professional compromises and Tony started to move in on her. He became her greatest friend during the time she was in the wheelchair, and a great deal of love grew between them.

Tony ended up protecting Reny from Santiago, who ends up paralyzed. Jessica moved to Guadalajara, Jalisco after finding she was suffering a terrible disease, Lalo purposely gets himself killed in a motorcycle crash, Chayanne decides that he and Reny should stay only as good friends because of their busy singing career schedules.

Sandra gets committed to a mental hospital, Reny starts using her real name again and makes a big comeback into the musical world, she goes on tour, and Tony marries her and they have a family.

Cast
 
Yuri as Renata "Reny" Jiménez/Chaquira
Chayanne as himself
Claudia Silva as Sandra "Sandy" Jiménez/Sandunga
Rafael Sánchez Navarro as Santiago Ugalde
Carmelita González as Encarnación
Pilar Montenegro as Jessica
María Elena Saldaña as Tina
Luis Couturier as Gabriel Jiménez
Margarita Isabel as Aurora
Silvia Suárez as Susana Ugalde
Carlos Miguel as Poncho
Raúl Alberto as Mike
Mauricio Islas as Freddy Landeros
Guillermo García Cantú as Tony
Fernando Ciangherotti as Eduardo "Lalo" Villafañe
Paco Ibáñez as Gustavo
Luisa Huertas as Magda
Vilma Traca as Teodora
Roberto Tello as Coreano
Alejandro Aragón as Dr. Francisco
Ricardo Barona as Humberto Navarro
Sussan Taunton as Rita
Radamés de Jesús as Paul
José Luis Avendaño as Dr. Humberto
Karyme Lozano as Liliana de Zares
Leonor Llausás as Anita
Isadora González as Sonia
Adriana Lavat as Flor
Patricia Martínez as Ágata
Alfonso Mier y Terán as Toby Reyes Retana de las Altas Torres
Mónica Dossetti as Karla Greta Reyes Retana de las Altas Torres
Beatriz Monroy as Adelina
Konnan as Himself
Beatriz Martinez
María Montejo
Gustavo Bermudez
Fernando Pinkus
Jaime Puga
Roberto Ruy
Lorena Álvarez
Verónica Macías
Graciela Magaña
Baltazar Oviedo
Rubén Santana
Alfredo Escobar
Paola Rodríguez
Roxana Castellanos
Ramón Coriat
Abigail Martínez
Ricardo Silva
Manuel Benítez
Rafael Valdés
Laura Serrano as herself

Awards

References

External links

1994 telenovelas
Mexican telenovelas
1994 Mexican television series debuts
1995 Mexican television series endings
Spanish-language telenovelas
Television shows set in Mexico
Televisa telenovelas